Kareshk (also Romanized as Kereshk; also known as Karishk) is a village in Kavirat Rural District, Chatrud District, Kerman County, Kerman Province, Iran. At the 2006 census, its population was 18, in 4 families.

References 

Populated places in Kerman County